Education in Washington may refer to:

 Education in Washington (state)
 Education in Washington, D.C.